The 2015 Nigerian House of Representatives elections in Federal Capital Territory was held on March 28, 2015, to elect members of the House of Representatives to represent Federal Capital Territory, Nigeria.

Overview

Summary

Results

Abaji/Gwagwalada/Kwali/Kuje 
Party candidates registered with the Independent National Electoral Commission to contest in the election. APC candidate Angulu Zakari Yamma won the election, defeating PDP Danladi Etsu Zhin and other party candidates.

Amac/Bwari 
Party candidates registered with the Independent National Electoral Commission to contest in the election. PDP candidate Zaphaniah Jisalo won the election.

References 

Federal Capital Territory House of Representatives elections
Federal Capital Territory